Jutish may refer to

 Jutes: the Jutish people;
 Jutlandic dialect;
 other things originating in, or associated with, Jutland – a region of modern Denmark.